The Permaculture Association is a registered charity that promotes the theory and practice of permaculture in Britain and worldwide.

The charity is based at offices in Kirkstall, Leeds, England, but connects a diverse network of individuals and projects, with over 1,400 members and over 100 demonstration sites. There are regional networks: Permaculture Scotland and Paramaethu Cymru.

History 

The Permaculture Association was established as a charity on 8 February 1983 and is registered in England and Scotland.

In Autumn 1982, a four day introduction to permaculture course was run in Blencarn, by Max Lindegger of Permaculture Nambour (Australia).

Activities 

The Permaculture Association offers its members a range of services including discounts for events, opportunities to network, promotion and support of projects and a telephone helpline. It "keeps a database listing hundreds of grassroots projects and educational organisations offering practical advice." It also certifies Permaculture Design Courses in the UK and runs a diploma in Applied Permaculture Design

The organisation was a partner in the Local Food consortium of the Big Lottery Fund's Changing Spaces programme.

The Permaculture Association also supports international projects such as the Permaculture Institute of El Salvador and the Himalayan Permaculture Institute.

The Permaculture Association hosted the International Permaculture Convergence (IPC), London 2015.

Current projects 
Research. Permaculture International Research Network, Information For Action on Climate Change, Research Digest.

Events. The Permaculture Association will have a stall at the Oxford Real Farming Conference 2018. The national convergence will next take place in September 2018.

Convergences 

The Permaculture Association organises a biennial national gathering of members, known as a convergence.

Permaculture Scotland and Paramaethu Cymru have held gatherings of their own annually since 2014. Members also typically organise regional and more local gatherings.

See also 
 Permaculture
 Transition Towns
 Plants for a Future
 Rob Hopkins
 Patrick Whitefield
 Ecodemia

References[8]

External links
 
 Local Food Website
 Permanent Publications Website

Educational charities based in the United Kingdom
Permaculture organizations
Horticultural organisations based in the United Kingdom
Sustainability organizations